Deb Richard (born June 13, 1963) is an American former professional golfer who was a member of the LPGA Tour for twenty years during the 1980s, 1990s and 2000s.

Amateur career 

Richard was born in Abbeville, Louisiana in 1963, and raised in Manhattan, Kansas.  She first found success as an amateur golfer by winning the Kansas state high school golf championship three consecutive years for Manhattan High School (1979–1981).  She followed by winning the Kansas Women's Amateur the next two years (1982, 1983).  In 1984, Richard won the prestigious U.S. Women's Amateur; a few months later she was part of the U.S. team that won the Espirito Santo Trophy in Hong Kong.

While competing for coach Mimi Ryan's Florida Gators women's golf team at the University of Florida from 1982 to 1985, she won seven tournaments including three consecutive Southeastern Conference (SEC) individual championships.  As a senior in 1985, she was the individual runner-up, by a single stroke, at the NCAA Women's Golf Championship, was recognized as the SEC Golfer of the Year, and won the Broderick Award as the nation's outstanding female collegiate golfer.  Richard was a first-team All-SEC selection all four years (1982–1985) and a first-team All-American in 1984 and 1985.  She graduated from Florida with a bachelor's degree in advertising in 1989, and was inducted into the University of Florida Athletic Hall of Fame as a "Gator Great" in 1995.

Professional career 

Richard played on the LPGA Tour for twenty years (1986–2005), during which she won five Tour events and finished in the top-10 in over seventy events. Her five wins included the 1987 Rochester International, 1991 Women's Kemper Open, 1991 The Phar-Mor in Youngstown, 1994 Safeco Classic and 1997 Friendly's Classic. Her best finishes in the LPGA majors included a tie for tenth place in the 1996 Kraft Nabisco Championship, a tie for fifth in the 1991 LPGA Championship, a tie for ninth in the 1986 U.S. Women's Open, and ties for fourth in the 1988 and 1998 du Maurier Classic. In 1992, Richard was selected for the U.S. Solheim Cup team. Her career earning as a professional golfer totaled $2,759,551.

Richard has been inducted into the Kansas Golf Hall of Fame. She has also received a number of awards for her charitable activities.

Professional wins (6)

LPGA Tour wins (5)

LPGA Tour playoff record (2–2)

Other wins (1)
1991 JBP Cup LPGA Match Play Championship

U.S. national team appearances
Amateur
Espirito Santo Trophy: 1984 (winners)

Professional
Solheim Cup: 1992

See also 

List of Florida Gators women's golfers on the LPGA Tour
List of University of Florida alumni
List of University of Florida Athletic Hall of Fame members

References

External links 

American female golfers
Florida Gators women's golfers
LPGA Tour golfers
Winners of ladies' major amateur golf championships
Solheim Cup competitors for the United States
Golfers from Louisiana
Golfers from Kansas
People from Abbeville, Louisiana
Sportspeople from Manhattan, Kansas
1963 births
Living people